Edward Henry Brien (1811-1902) was Archdeacon of Emly  from 1858 until 1880.

Brien was born in Devon and educated at Trinity College, Dublin.  He was the Rector of Enniskerry until his appointment as Archdeacon.

References

Irish Anglicans
Alumni of Trinity College Dublin
Archdeacons of Emly
1811 births
1902 deaths
Clergy from Devon